Danijel Stojanović (born 18 August 1984) is a Croatian professional footballer who plays as a left-back.

A part from playing as a left-back as his main position, he can even play in a more advanced left wing-back role.

Career
Stojanović began his professional football career at the youth team of Croatian 1. HNL club Cibalia, where he played for two years under a youth contract. In 2005, he earned his first professional contract with, at the time, Bosnian Premier League side Posušje. In the three years he spent at the club, for the most time Stojanović was the first choice left-back and made 55 league appearances, scoring five goals.

These performances merited a move to the ambitious club Zrinjski Mostar in 2008. He was immediately a starter for the club. In the title winning season of 2008–09, Stojanović made 29 appearances and scored six goals while in the previous season, due to injuries he managed only 17 league appearances.

At the end of the 2009–10 season, his contract with Zrinjski came to an end and so Stojanović decided to continue his career in Portugal, signing as a free agent on a two-year deal with Nacional. He became only the second Zrinjski Mostar player to move to Portugal, after Lamine Diarra made the switch in 2007. He struggled to acclimatise to the speed and quality of the Portuguese Primeira Liga and only made 19 appearances during his time at the club.

He then moved back to his homeland, signing for Hajduk Split as a replacement for the departing Rúben Lima. Stojanović was officially unveiled as a new player of Hajduk on 4 July 2012. He won the Croatian Cup with the club in May 2013. 

In June 2013, Stojanović's contract with Hajduk was terminated, and on 29 December 2013, he returned to Zrinjski Mostar. He played for Zrinjski until January 2017, winning 2 more league titles in the process. After Zrinjski, Stojanović spent a short time with Željezničar from January to June 2017.

In June 2017, he signed a contract with, at the time, First League of FBiH club Olimpik. Stojanović scored his first goal for Olimpik on 19 May 2019, in a 6–1 home league win against TOŠK Tešanj. On 26 May 2020, the 2019–20 First League of FBiH season ended abruptly due to the ongoing COVID-19 pandemic in Bosnia and Herzegovina and, by default, Stojanović with Olimpik were crowned league champions and got promoted back to the Bosnian Premier League. After his contract with the club expired, he left Olimpik on 15 June 2020.

Honours
Zrinjski Mostar
Bosnian Premier League: 2008–09, 2013–14, 2015–16

Hajduk Split
Croatian Cup: 2012–13

Olimpik
First League of FBiH: 2019–20

References

External links
 
Danijel Stojanović at Sofascore

1984 births
Living people
People from Našice
Association football fullbacks
Croatian footballers
HNK Cibalia players
NK Hrvatski Dragovoljac players
HŠK Posušje players
HŠK Zrinjski Mostar players
C.D. Nacional players
HNK Hajduk Split players
FK Željezničar Sarajevo players
FK Olimpik players
Croatian Football League players
First Football League (Croatia) players
Premier League of Bosnia and Herzegovina players
Primeira Liga players
First League of the Federation of Bosnia and Herzegovina players
Croatian expatriate footballers
Expatriate footballers in Bosnia and Herzegovina
Croatian expatriate sportspeople in Bosnia and Herzegovina
Expatriate footballers in Portugal
Croatian expatriate sportspeople in Portugal